Milan Pleština (born 3 May 1961) is a Croatian actor. He appeared in more than thirty films since 1987.

Selected filmography

References

External links 

1961 births
Living people
Actors from Split, Croatia
Croatian male film actors